is a Japanese rock band formed in Tokyo in 1998. Since their formation, they have released 9 albums, 20 EPs and 6 DVDs. Their album Adze of penguin (2008) reached number 9 on the Oricon Albums Chart.

Discography

Studio albums
K. and his Bike (2003)
Quake and Brook (2005)
Alfred and Cavity (2006)
Adze of Penguin (2008)
Scent of August (2011)
街の14景 (2013)
謎のオープンワールド (2015)
Memories to Go (2017)
Ninja of Four (2022)

Extended plays
Fool Proof (2001)
Eric. W (2002)
Recognize (2004)
Daniels (2006)
Fadeouts (for Justice) (2007)
Intoxication (2010)
The Surface (2010)
Detoxification (2011)
2012 (2012)
Tokumaru (2013)
Bongo (2014)
TENNIS CLUB E.P. (2015)
Daniels E.P. 2 (2016)
Falling in Love (2018)
POOL e.p. (2019)
Sons are back e.p. (2020)
August e.p. (2020)
September e.p. (2020)
October e.p. (2020)
November e.p. (2020)

DVDs
Eric the Fool Recognized His Bike Quakes (2005)
Stanley on the 2nd floor (2007)
Shits (2009)
Blessing hamlet (2009)
String 4 Snowman (2011)
510x283 (2014)

References

External links

 – official site

Japanese rock music groups
Musical groups established in 1998
Musical groups from Tokyo